Damir Rinatovich Shaykhtdinov (born 20 November 2003) is a Russian football player who plays for FC Zenit-2 Saint Petersburg.

Club career
He made his debut in the Russian Football National League for FC Spartak-2 Moscow on 8 August 2021 in a game against FC Veles Moscow.

On 23 August 2022 he signed a contract with FC Zenit Saint Petersburg.

References

External links
 
 
 Profile by Russian Football National League

2003 births
People from Ozyory, Moscow Oblast
Sportspeople from Moscow Oblast
Living people
Russian footballers
Russia youth international footballers
Association football defenders
FC Spartak-2 Moscow players
FC Zenit-2 Saint Petersburg players
Russian First League players
Russian Second League players